At the basketball at the Mediterranean 2001 Games tournament, there were eight individual men's and women's international basketball teams taking part in the 2001 edition of the Mediterranean Games.

First, there is a break down of the medalists for both the men's and women's teams from gold, to silver, to bronze. Also, there is a breakdown of the standings for both the men's competition, and the women's competition. There is also a list of medalists in order from gold, to silver, to bronze. At the chart at the bottom of the article for the men's competition, the three ranks of medalists in order from gold to bronze are: Spain, Greece, and Italy. There is also an input of the three ranks of medalists in order from gold, to bronze for the women's competition. If you take another look of the chart at the bottom of the article, Croatia, Italy, and Spain, won the medals for gold, silver, and bronze.

Medalists

Standings

Men's Competition

Women's Competition

References
 Complete 2001 Mediterranean Games Standings

Basketball
Basketball at the Mediterranean Games
International basketball competitions hosted by Tunisia
2001–02 in Lebanese basketball
2001–02 in European basketball
2001 in African basketball